Trees and Grass and Things is the second album recorded by American saxophonist Charles Williams in 1971 for the Mainstream label.

Reception

AllMusic awarded the album 3 stars.

Track listing
All compositions by Charles Williams except as indicated
 "Trees and Grass and Things" (Don Pullen) - 4:33
 "Chop! Chop!" (Charles Williams, Don Pullen, William Curtis, David Brooks) 4:34
 "Cracklin' Bread" - 7:37
 "Exactly Like You" (Dorothy Fields, Jimmy McHugh) - 4:40
 "Booger Bear" - 4:48
 "Moving Up" (Pullen) - 5:42
 "Song from the Old Country" (Pullen) - 6:17

Personnel 
Charles Williams - alto saxophone
David "Bubba" Brooks - tenor saxophone
Cornell Dupree - guitar
Don Pullen - piano, organ
Jimmy Lewis - electric bass
Bill Curtis - drums
Montego Joe - congas

References 

1971 albums
Charles Williams (musician) albums
Mainstream Records albums
Albums produced by Bob Shad